Aruchan (also Romanized as Ārūchān, Aroochan, and Ārūjān; also known as Alūchān and Ūrchān) is a village in Abgarm Rural District, Abgarm District, Avaj County, Qazvin Province, Iran. At the 2006 census, its population was 654, in 155 families.

References 

Populated places in Avaj County